Great Houghton Halt was a small railway station on the Dearne Valley Railway (DVR) situated between Goldthorpe and Thurnscoe Halt and Grimethorpe Halt. The halt served the village of Great Houghton in South Yorkshire, England.

The station opened on 3 June 1912. Originally named Houghton Halt, it was renamed Great Houghton Halt a few weeks later, on 24 August 1912. At first, trains were operated on behalf of the DVR by the Lancashire and Yorkshire Railway; when that company amalgamated with the London and North Western Railway on 1 January 1922, the combined organisation (also known as the London and North Western Railway) absorbed the DVR on the same day.

The station closed on 10 September 1951.

References

External links 
 Great Houghton station on navigable 1955 O. S. map

Disused railway stations in Barnsley
Former Dearne Valley Railway stations
Railway stations in Great Britain opened in 1912
Railway stations in Great Britain closed in 1951
1912 establishments in England